Ooni Orarigba was the 44th Ooni of Ife, a paramount traditional ruler of Ile Ife, the ancestral home of the Yorubas. He succeeded Ooni Ooni Degbinsokun and was succeeded by Ooni Derin Ologbenla. He is the great-great grandfather of the current Ooni of Ife Adeyeye Enitan Ogunwusi.

References

Oonis of Ife
Yoruba history